Eucalyptus forresterae, commonly known as brumby sallee, is a species of "whipstick" mallee that is endemic to a restricted area in Victoria. It has smooth greenish to whitish bark, glossy green, lance-shaped to narrow egg-shaped adult leaves, flower buds in groups of between eleven and twenty one, white flowers and conical or shortened hemispherical fruit.

Description
Flowering occurs in summer and the flowers are white.

Taxonomy and naming
Eucalyptus forresterae was first formally described in 2011 by Kevin Rule and William Molyneux in the journal Muelleria but the description was not valid because no holotype was designated. A subsequent edition of the same journal corrected the typification. The specific epithet (forresterae) honours Sue Forrester who collected the type specimens with Molyneux.

Distribution
Brumby sallee is only known from a few rocky sites at altitudes above  in the Cobberas Range.

Conservation status
This species is listed as "endangered" on the Victorian Government's Department of Sustainability and Environment's Advisory List of Rare Or Threatened Plants In Victoria.

See also
List of Eucalyptus species

References

Flora of Victoria (Australia)
Trees of Australia
forresterae
Myrtales of Australia
Plants described in 2011